The 2017–18 Algerian Cup was the 54th edition of the Algerian Cup. The winner qualified for the 2018–19 CAF Confederation Cup, The final was played in the July 5, 1962 Stadium. USM Bel Abbès were the eventual winners.

Teams

Regional rounds 
These are the results of the last regional rounds played on 25 November 2017.

Fourth regional round

Ligue Régionale de Football d'Alger

Ligue Régionale de Football d'Oran

Ligue Régionale de Football de Saïda

Ligue Régionale de Football de Ouargla

Ligue Régionale de Football de Blida

Ligue Régionale de Football d'Annaba

Ligue Régionale de Football de Constantine

Ligue Régionale de Football de Batna

Region of Béchar

National rounds

Round of 64 
The Round of 64 draw took place on 5 December and was broadcast live on Algérie 3 at 18:00 local time. All 32 Round of 64 ties are due to be played on the weekend of 29 December. 48 teams from the qualifying competition join the 16 teams from Ligue Professionnelle 1 to compete in this round. The round includes one team from Level 7 still in the competition, US Firme, who are the lowest-ranked team in this round from the city of Chlef and his second participation in this round after the first season 1996–97. Twenty-one years later, US Firme will meet against USM Alger one more time, This round will see one match between two teams from Ligue Professionnelle 1, CS Constantine against NA Hussein Dey.

Round of 32

Round of 16

Quarter-finals

Semi-finals

Final

References

External links 
National compétitions - LFP official website

Algerian Cup
Algerian Cup
Algerian Cup